Ars Magica is a fantasy role-playing game.

Ars Magica may also refer to:
 Ars Magica (Judith Tarr novel), a 1989 novel by Judith Tarr 
 Ars Magica (Nerea Riesco novel), a 2007 novel by Nerea Riesco

See also
 Artes magicae, arts prohibited by canon law